Ordrupia fanniella is a moth in the Copromorphidae family. It was described by August Busck in 1912. It is found in Panama.

References

Natural History Museum Lepidoptera generic names catalog

Copromorphidae
Moths described in 1912